Wesley A. Swift (September 6, 1913 – October 8, 1970) was a minister from Southern California who was known for his white supremacist views and was the central figure in Christian Identity from the 1940s until his death in 1970.

Early life and influences
Wesley Albert Swift was born in New Jersey on September 6, 1913, the son of R.C. Swift, a methodist minister who pastored a church on Long Island, New York.

Raised as a Methodist, Swift converted to Pentecostalism in the early 1930s. Swift was a student at  L.I.F.E. Bible College at the Angelus Temple, Aimee Semple McPherson's Pentecostal Foursquare Church, during the 1930s. Swift later served as a minister at the Angelus Temple during the 1930s and 1940s.

Swift's wife, Genevieve, told interviewers that he was introduced to British Israelism by Gerald Burton Winrod, a Nazi and evangelist from Kansas, who was a speaker at Angelus Temple. Swift was a student of Rev. Philip Monson's Kingdom Bible School during the 1930s; Monson taught British Israelism and some of the racial teachings which Swift would later reformulate into Christian Identity theology. Swift was also exposed to Charles Parham's British Israel teachings at the Angelus Temple. During the 1930s and 1940s, Swift became a leader of the local British Israel community, serving as president of the Anglo-Saxon Christian society, leader of the Great Pyramid Club, and leader of the Anglo-Saxon Bible Study Group at Angelus Temple. In the mid-1940s, Swift emerged as the best known advocate of Christian Identity.

In a December 1932 Los Angeles Times news story, it was reported that Swift foiled an attempt to kidnap his wife. Swift fired shots at the kidnappers and the family escaped into the Angelus Temple to evade their persuers.

Christian Identity and White Supremacy

British Israel leader
In the 1940s, Swift founded his own church, Anglo-Saxon Christian Congregation, which he renamed the Church of Jesus Christ Christian in 1957. The church's website now states that "Wesley Swift is considered the single most significant figure in the early years of the Christian Identity movement in the United States." Most sources give 1948 as the year in which Swift incorporated his church, but one source reported 1946. Michael Barkun described Swift as the "central figure" in Christian Identity between the 1940s and his 1970 death.

Ku Klux Klan
In 1946, while living in Lancaster, California, Swift was taken in for questioning by police in connection to a cross burning near San Bernardino. Swift denied being involved in the klan at the time.

Swift was involved in the revival of a branch of the Ku Klux Klan in California during the mid-1940s, helping to establish the short lived California Klan. Roy Elonzo Davis and William Upshaw were in California at the time and they assisted in fundraising efforts for the Klan. Swift was responsible for the formation of the Antelope Valley chapter of the Ku Klux Klan.

Swift worked closely with Gerald L.K. Smith, an American Nazi sympathizer and politician from the 1940s. Wesley Swift was billed as a speaker at the Little Rock Nine protests, but did not speak and instead served as one of the hooded klansmen escorting and protecting Gerald Smith during one of his speeches.

Christian Identity pioneer
"Swift pioneered a particularly insidious form" of racism which became "the most distinctive element" of Christian Identity theology: that non-whites and Jews are the "biological offspring" of Satan (the serpent). Swift combined the two-seed-line teaching of British Israelism with Russel Kelso Carter's theory about the sexual nature of Eve's sin in the garden of Eden. He concluded that "the violation of Divine law by Lucifer" was caused by "interbreeding" of "the peoples of earth". He insisted the black, brown, yellow and red races were all the products of interbreeding with Cain's descendants.

Swift believed "that the only descendants of Adam are the white men" ... "and the rest of the beings represent the agents of evil because of their direct link with the fallen angels." The teaching also associated the offspring of Satan (the serpent) "with the activities of the Catholic Church and the pope". The ideology taught that descendants of the serpent could be identified genetically, claiming that "the nature of the seed of the serpent are as fixed as the skin of a modern Ethiopian or the spots of a leopard", and that "what is genetically marked cannot and will not change." Swift believed "an extreme doctrine of the Calvinist double predestination, in which those predestined to salvation and those predestined to perdition can be recognized only by their racial status."

Interracial marriage was an important topic to Swift. He believed races could coexist so long as segregation was maintained. He said "there isn’t anything wrong with being black, but there is something wrong when you try to mix that black species with the white man, that is a violation of God’s law, that is wrong". Swift's believed salvation was possible for all races, but that their status as lower orders of beings would always be maintained. He explained by saying, "Do not worry about these other races. You teach them to worship the right God and you set them free… He says He will go to the end of the earth and that eventually, all of these people, all of them, shall be saved and justified according to His purpose and His plan." Swift insisted that " God’s plan for the world is segregation and a preservation of Kind," and he viewed whites as the master race who would rule over all other races. Swift relied heavily on the Book of Enoch to justify his theology. The Christian Identity ideas held by Swift were viewed as extreme by some others on the far right. Swift's views were denounced by Robert W. Welch Jr., the founder of the John Birch Society, but supported and financed by Birch supporter James Oviatt, for whom the James Oviatt Building is named.

Swift continued to promote some classical British Israel beliefs. He viewed the United States and the Anglo-Saxon race as true descendants of Israel, saying "This great nation of ours is one of the great nations of Israel." Swift deviated from traditional British Israel thought by associating God's "divine covenant" with a race, rather than a nation. He also deviated from traditional British Israelism by associating the Tribe of Judah with Germans, and claiming the Jewish people were imposters; British Israelism believed the Jewish people to be Tribe of Judah.

Swift believed and promoted the idea of a militarized end-of-the-world apocalypse, which would culminate in a war between the races he believed were descendants of the serpent, and the pure race he believed was descended from Adam. As a result of his beliefs, he was very active in organizing armed militia to prepare for the supposed end-of-days conflict.

Influence and legacy

Swift attracted a group of like-minded ministers who helped spread Christian Identity views. Key figures assisting Swift included Connie Lynch, a fellow KKK recruiter, Oren Petito, a neo-Nazi, and Neuman Britton. Petito was a leader in the National States' Rights Party, whose mailing address was in Jeffersonville, Indiana. William Potter Gale was a disciple of Swift who grew in importance in the group.

The Attorney General of California named Swift as the leader in the California Rangers and the Christian Defense League, paramilitary organizations for White Supremacists, in a 1965 report. Swift spread his teachings through recorded tapes of his sermons and tracts.

Swift did not create a systematic theology. Beyond his racial views, he did not offer any other significant religious views. Swift claimed his teachings to be the true successor of British Israel thought. He traced himself in a line of succession back to the earliest teachers of the ideology through his teacher, Phillip Monson, to Howard Rand, to C.A.L. Totten, to Edward Hine. Gerald Smith publicized Swift's ministry through his publications where he advertised Swift's tracts and recordings on Christian Identity topics beginning in the 1940s. Smith also assisted Swift in organizing speaking tours and conventions among the British Israel and white supremacist's communities in the 1940s and 1950s.

William Branham was influenced by Swift's teachings, and re-branded elements of Christian Identity as "Serpent Seed" and spread it among his followers from 1958. Several figures associated with Swift were also key members of Branham's campaigning team. Arnold Murray, a Missouri based televangelist was ordained in the Church of Jesus Christ. Swift's ideology has influenced generations of white supremacists.

By 1966, Swift had established a chain of churches in California, Arkansas, Louisiana, Missouri, Florida, Washington, and other places in the United States. In the 1990s, there were 245 reported ministers and groups in the United States, across 41 states who were promoting Christian Identity teachings he espoused. David Duke and Tom Metzger were heavily influenced by Swift's teachings and were major promoters of his teachings in the 1970s and 1980s. After Swift's death, the headquarters of Swift's church was moved to Idaho and renamed Aryan Nations by his successor, Richard Girnt Butler. Butler built on Swift's teachings to build what he called a "white bastion" in Hayden Lake, Idaho.

Swift collapsed and died of a heart attack in a Mexican clinic on October 8, 1970, while waiting to receive treatment for kidney disease and diabetes.

References

Sources

See also
Christian Identity
Serpent Seed

1913 births
1970 deaths
Christian Identity
Christian conspiracy theorists
American Ku Klux Klan members
Methodist ministers
Former Methodists
Ku Klux Klan in California
American white supremacists